Pauline Helène "Polly" Higgins  (4 July 1968 – 21 April 2019) was a Scottish barrister, author, and environmental lobbyist, described by Jonathan Watts in her obituary in The Guardian as, "one of the most inspiring figures in the green movement". She left her career as a lawyer to focus on environmental advocacy, and unsuccessfully lobbied the United Nations Law Commission to recognise ecocide as an international crime. Higgins wrote three books, including Eradicating Ecocide, and started the Earth Protectors group to raise funds to support the cause..

Early life and education 
Higgins was raised in Blanefield just south of the Highland Boundary Fault at the foot of the Campsie Hills in Scotland. Her father was a meteorologist during the Second World War and her mother was an artist. The family commitment to climate and green issues influenced her early years. After attending the Glasgow Jesuit school St Aloysius' College (1986) she completed her first degree from the University of Aberdeen (1990) and also gained a First Class Diploma from Utrecht University and a Post-graduate degree University of Glasgow (1991). During her university years, she collaborated with Friedensreich Hundertwasser, an artist and environmental activist from Austria. They later went to Vienna, where she was influenced by the European ecology movement. In 2013, she earned a Doctor Honoris Causa from Business School Lausanne, Switzerland.

She trained in law at City University and the Inns of Court School of Law in London; in 1998, she was called to the Bar (in England). She practised as a lawyer based in London, specialising in corporate law and employment.

Advocacy 
At the end of a three-year case representing a person who had been injured at work, Higgins described looking out the window at the Court of Appeal and thinking "The earth is being injured and harmed as well and nothing is being done about it" and "the earth is in need of a good lawyer". Subsequently, she stopped practising as a barrister to focus on advocating for an international law that would hold business executives and governments to account by rendering them criminally liable for the environmental harm that they cause. George Monbiot describes the impact this might have.

Ecocide had been proposed as one of the international crimes against peace in 1996, but failed to be included in the final Rome Statute of the International Criminal Court. Higgins started to campaign for its inclusion in around 2009. She explained in 2010 that ecocide "leads to resource depletion, and where there is escalation of resource depletion, war comes chasing behind. Where such destruction arises out of the actions of mankind, ecocide can be regarded as a crime against peace." She lobbied the United Nations Law Commission to recognise ecocide as an international crime, but at the time of her death, this goal had not been achieved.

As part of her campaign, Higgins wrote Eradicating Ecocide and started the Earth Protectors fundraising group. She was a founder of the Earth Law Alliance. In 2009, Higgins was described by The Ecologist magazine as "one of the world's top ten visionary thinkers". She was ranked number 35 in Salt magazine's 2016 Top 100 Inspiring Women of the world list.

Personal life 
After leaving Scotland, Higgins lived in London and later settled near Stroud, Gloucestershire. She was married to Ian Lawrie, a judge and QC.

In March 2019, George Monbiot stated that Higgins had been diagnosed with terminal cancer. She died on 21 April 2019, at the age of 50. She is buried in Slad, Gloucestershire.

Selected publications 
Books
 Eradicating Ecocide: Laws and Governance to Prevent the Destruction of Our Planet (2010)
 Earth Is Our Business: Changing the Rules of the Game (2012)
 I Dare you to be Great (2014)
 Dare to be Great (2020) (re-publication with new introduction & appendices)

Papers

Honours and Recognitions

 1998 - Call to the Bar
 2009 - The Ecologist - One of the world’s top ten visionary thinkers who "demonstrated a clear vision for a better world"
 2010-11 - The People’s Book Prize – Non-fiction – Eradicating Ecocide by Polly Higgins
 2012 - Rachel Carson 50th Anniversary Memorial Lecture 2012 (London and the Netherlands) - "Ending the Era of Ecocide" (Ecocide – the Fifth Crime Against Peace)
 2013-14 - Arne Naess Professorial Chair (non-academic) in Global Justice and the Environment at the University of Oslo, Norway
 2016 - Salt Magazine: - Salt and Diageo's Top 100 Inspiring Women of the World, #35 Polly Higgins
 2017 - Honor of Ekotopfilm, Slovakia, "Her proposal to extend the jurisdiction of the International Criminal Court would define ecocide as an international crime alongside genocide, war crimes, crimes against humanity and crimes of aggression."
 2019 - Ekotopfilm, Slovakia - Prize of the International Jury in Memory of Polly Higgins

Scottish decorations
 Royal Scottish Geographical Society: - Shackleton Medal, 2018

Awards 
Eradicating Ecocide was voted non-fiction winner of the national People's Book Prize in 2011. Higgins delivered the Rachel Carson Memorial Lecture in 2012. She held an honorary (non-academic) Arne Naess Professorship at the University of Oslo (2013–14) and received an honorary doctorate from the Business School Lausanne, Switzerland (2013). She was awarded an honorary fellowship of the Royal Scottish Geographical Society in 2018. Her other awards include Polarbröd's Utstickarpriset for Future Leadership (2016) and a Slovakian Ekotopfilm Award (2017).

References 

1968 births
2019 deaths
Women human rights activists
21st-century Scottish lawyers
Place of birth missing
Fellows of the Royal Scottish Geographical Society
Scottish women lawyers
20th-century Scottish lawyers
Place of death missing
Environmental lawyers
Deaths from cancer in England
Alumni of the University of Aberdeen
Utrecht University alumni
Alumni of the University of Glasgow
Alumni of the Inns of Court School of Law
Scottish barristers
20th-century women lawyers
21st-century women lawyers
20th-century Scottish women